The 1920–21 Sussex County Football League season was the first in the history of the Sussex County League

League
The league featured 12 teams. Eastbourne were also playing in the Southern Amateur League, and opted to leave the Sussex County League at the end of the season.

League table

Stadia and locations

References

1920-21
9